The NFL Top 100 Players of 2020 is the tenth season in the NFL Top 100 series. It premiered on July 26, 2020 and the final episode aired on July 29, 2020. It started later than in previous years, and the show was shown in 4 consecutive days instead. Baltimore Ravens quarterback and reigning NFL MVP Lamar Jackson was voted number 1. The New Orleans Saints had the most selections with 7, while the Cincinnati Bengals, Miami Dolphins, New York Jets, Jacksonville Jaguars, Detroit Lions, and Washington Football Team had no selections. Atlanta Falcons running back Todd Gurley had the biggest drop, dropping 46 spots. Tennessee Titans running back Derrick Henry had the biggest increase in position jumping 89 spots. Tampa Bay Buccaneers wide receiver Antonio Brown, who was a free agent at the time the countdown aired, was the highest ranking player from the 2019 countdown, ranked 7th in 2019, to not be ranked in 2020.

Episode list

The list

Sources 
2020 Pro Bowl rosters: 
2019 All-Pro Team: 
 PFWA All-Rookie Team:

References 

National Football League trophies and awards
National Football League records and achievements
National Football League lists